Terry Taylor (born September 23, 1999) is an American professional basketball player for the Chicago Bulls of the National Basketball Association (NBA), on a two-way contract with the Windy City Bulls of the NBA G League. He played college basketball for the Austin Peay Governors.

Early life and high school career
Taylor grew up in Bowling Green, Kentucky and attended Bowling Green High School. During his junior year, he averaged 15.3 points and 11.3 rebounds per game and was named second team All-State. Taylor committed to play college basketball at Austin Peay State University going into his senior year over offers from Texas Southern and Southeast Missouri State. As a senior, Taylor averaged 17.7 points and 11.8 rebounds per game and was named first team All-State and the MVP of the Kentucky Sweet 16 after averaging 20.5 points and 10 rebounds as he led Bowling Green to its first state title. Taylor scored 1,704 points and grabbed 1,300 rebounds over four seasons with Bowling Green.

College career
As a true freshman, Taylor averaged 15.6 points and 8.6 rebounds per game and was named the Ohio Valley Conference (OVC) Freshman of the Year and first team All-OVC. As a sophomore he averaged 20.5 points and 10.5 rebounds per game and was again named first team All-OVC. He scored the 1,000th point of his college career during the season as part of a 25-point, 12-rebound performance in a win over Eastern Illinois on February 9, 2019. Taylor's career-high 39 points came on December 17, in a 80–61 win over McKendree. On January 23, 2020, Taylor hit a career-high six three-pointers and had 37 points and 14 rebounds in a 99–74 win over Tennessee State. Taylor was named the Ohio Valley Conference Men's Basketball Player of the Year and first team All-OVC for a third straight season as a junior after averaging 21.8 points, 11.0 rebounds and 1.3 blocks per game. Following the season, Taylor declared for the 2020 NBA draft, but maintained his college eligibility, ultimately returning for his senior year.

On December 5, 2020, Taylor surpassed the 2,000 career point mark, scoring 10 points in a 102–38 win against Carver College.

Professional career

Fort Wayne Mad Ants (2021)
After not being selected in the 2021 NBA draft, Taylor signed with the Indiana Pacers on August 5, 2021. However, he was waived on October 15 and nine days later, he signed with the Fort Wayne Mad Ants as an affiliate player. He averaged 19.5 points, 12.1 rebounds, 2.3 assists and 1.3 blocks in 11 games.

Indiana Pacers (2021–2023) 
On December 15, 2021, Taylor signed a two-way contract with the Indiana Pacers. Under the terms of the deal, he split time between the Pacers and the Fort Wayne Mad Ants.

On February 2, 2022, in his seventh NBA game against the Orlando Magic, Taylor subbed in 22 seconds into the game and stepped up as the Pacers’ center. He recorded career highs of 24 points, 16 rebounds and 3 assists in 37 minutes for his first career double-double. On April 7, the Pacers converted his two-way contract into a standard one.

On February 9, 2023, Taylor was waived by the Pacers.

Chicago Bulls (2023–present)
On February 22, 2023, Taylor signed a two-way contract with the Chicago Bulls.

Career statistics

NBA

Regular season

|-
| style="text-align:left;"| 
| style="text-align:left;"| Indiana
| 33 || 7 || 21.6 || .614 || .316 || .706 || 5.2 || 1.2 || .4 || .2 || 9.6
|-
| style="text-align:left;"| 
| style="text-align:left;"| Indiana
| 26 || 2 || 8.8 || .462 || .222 || .714 || 1.5 || .4 || .1 || .2 || 2.7
|- class="sortbottom"
| style="text-align:center;" colspan="2"| Career
| 59 || 9 || 16.0 || .579 || .286 || .707 || 3.6 || .9 || .3 || .2 || 6.6

College

|-
| style="text-align:left;"| 2017–18
| style="text-align:left;"| Austin Peay
| 34 || 34 || 31.5 || .541 || .432 || .730 || 8.6 || .7 || .6 || 1.0 || 15.6
|-
| style="text-align:left;"| 2018–19
| style="text-align:left;"| Austin Peay
| 33 || 33 || 33.1 || .531 || .340 || .741 || 8.9 || 1.7 || 1.1 || .9 || 20.5
|-
| style="text-align:left;"| 2019–20
| style="text-align:left;"| Austin Peay
| 33 || 33 || 36.6 || .550 || .320 || .652 || 11.0 || 1.4 || 1.3 || 1.3 || 21.8
|-
| style="text-align:left;"| 2020–21
| style="text-align:left;"| Austin Peay
| 27 || 27 || 37.0 || .521 || .279 || .794 || 11.1 || 1.6 || 1.2 || .9 || 21.6
|- class="sortbottom"
| style="text-align:center;" colspan="2"| Career
| 127 || 127 || 34.4 || .536 || .341 || .725 || 9.8 || 1.4 || 1.0 || 1.0 || 19.7

See also
List of NCAA Division I men's basketball players with 2,000 points and 1,000 rebounds

References

External links
Austin Peay Governors bio

1999 births
Living people
21st-century African-American sportspeople
African-American basketball players
American men's basketball players
Austin Peay Governors men's basketball players
Basketball players from Kentucky
Chicago Bulls players
Fort Wayne Mad Ants players
Indiana Pacers players
Shooting guards
Small forwards
Sportspeople from Bowling Green, Kentucky
Undrafted National Basketball Association players
Windy City Bulls players